The bust of Thomas Baker is a 1638 marble portrait sculpture created by the Italian artist Gian Lorenzo Bernini, with much of the bust undertaken by a pupil of Bernini, probably Andrea Bolgi. It is currently held in the Victoria and Albert Museum, London, who purchased the bust in 1921 for 1480 English guineas.

Subject
Baker (1606–58) was High Sheriff of Suffolk in 1657 and connected to the court of Charles I. He may have been indirectly involved in another Bernini bust, carrying the triple portrait of Charles I by Van Dyck to Rome; it was from this portrait that Bernini carved the now-destroyed bust of King Charles.

See also
List of works by Gian Lorenzo Bernini

References

External links

Busts by Gian Lorenzo Bernini
1630s sculptures
1638 works
Marble sculptures in the United Kingdom
Busts in the United Kingdom
Sculptures of the Victoria and Albert Museum